Pope Paul V (r. 1605–1621) created 60 cardinals in ten consistories.

July 18, 1605

 Scipione Borghese

September 11, 1606

 Ludovico de Torres
 Orazio Spinola
 Maffeo Barberini
 Giovanni Garzia Millini
 Bartolomeo Ferratini
 Bonifazio Caetani
 Marcello Lante della Rovere
 Orazio Maffei

December 10, 1607

 Ferenc Forgách
 François de La Rochefoucauld
 Jerónimo Xavierre
 Prince Maurice of Savoy
 Ferdinando Gonzaga

November 24, 1608

 Michelangelo Tonti
 Fabrizio Veralli
 Giambattista Leni
 Lanfranco Margotti
 Luigi Capponi

August 17, 1611

 Decio Carafa
 Domenico Rivarola
 Metello Bichi
 Jean de Bonsi
 Filippo Filonardi
 Pier Paolo Crescenzi
 Giacomo Serra
 Orazio Lancellotti
 Agostino Galamini
 Gaspar de Borja y Velasco
 Felice Centini

December 2, 1615

 Francesco Vendramino
 Louis of Guise
 Roberto Ubaldini
 Tiberio Muti
 Gabriel Trejo Paniagua
 Baltasar Moscoso y Sandoval
 Carlo de' Medici
 Vincenzo Gonzaga
 Giulio Savelli
 Alessandro Orsini
 Melchior Klesl

September 19, 1616

 Alessandro Ludovisi
 Ladislao d'Aquino
 Ottavio Belmosto
 Pietro Campori
 Matteo Priuli
 Scipione Cobelluzzi

March 26, 1618

 Henri de Gondi
 Francisco Gómez de Sandoval, 1st Duke of Lerma

July 29, 1619

 Ferdinand of Austria

January 11, 1621

 Francesco Cennini de' Salamandri
 Guido Bentivoglio
 Pietro Valier
 Eitel Frederick von Hohenzollern-Sigmaringen
 Louis de Nogaret de La Valette
 Giulio Roma
 Cesare Gherardi
 Desiderio Scaglia
 Stefano Pignatelli
 Agustín de Spínola Basadone

References

Paul V
Pope Paul V
17th-century Catholicism
College of Cardinals